The Bishop of Blackburn is the Ordinary of the Church of England Diocese of Blackburn in the Province of York.

The diocese covers much of the county of Lancashire and has its see in the town of Blackburn, where the seat of the diocese is located at the Cathedral Church of Saint Mary.  Despite having a cathedral Blackburn is not a city.

The office has existed since the foundation of the see from part of the Diocese of Manchester in 1926 under George V. The See is currently vacant following the retirement of Julian Henderson on 31 August 2022; in the vacancy, Philip North, the Bishop suffragan of Burnley, is also acting diocesan bishop. The bishop's residence is Bishop's House, Salesbury. On 10 January 2023, it was announced that North had been nominated to become the next diocesan bishop.

List of bishops

Assistant bishops
Among those who have served as assistant bishops in the diocese were:
19821999 (d.): Ken Giggall (former Bishop of St Helena and Auxiliary Bishop of Gibraltar) retired to Lytham
19922000 (ret.): Donald Nestor, Priest-in-Charge of Bretherton and former Suffragan Bishop of Lesotho

References

Blackburn

Lancashire-related lists